Chon Jong-won (born February 7, 1996) is a South Korean sport climber, who won the IFSC Climbing World Cup in 2015 and 2017 in the bouldering discipline.

Biography 
In 2012 Chon participated in his first international youth competitions. In 2013 he won second place in the Asian youth championships. Since 2014 he climbs as an adult in the Bouldering World Cup. In his first season, he reached the finals twice and won fourth place both times. He finished the season at rank 9.

Chon reached the finals of the IFSC World Cup four times in 2015 and finished 6th in Toronto, 2nd in Chongquing, 1st in Haiyang, and 3rd in Munich. These rankings were enough for him to win the season, ahead of Jan Hojer of Germany and Adam Ondra of the Czech Republic.

In 2016 he came 3rd in the IFSC World Cup in Chongqing, 4th in Navi Mumbai and 2nd in Munich. He came 1st in Innsbruck, reaching 4th place for the season. He also came first place in La Sportiva Legends Only, with impressive shows of finger strength.

In the past, Chon participated in competitions in the disciplines of lead climbing and speed climbing, but since he began climbing in the World Cup, he has specialized in bouldering.

Rankings

Climbing World Cup

Climbing World Championships

Number of medals in the Climbing World Cup

Bouldering

References

External links 

 
 
 
 

1996 births
Living people
Sportspeople from Seoul
South Korean rock climbers
Asian Games medalists in sport climbing
Sport climbers at the 2018 Asian Games
Asian Games gold medalists for South Korea
Medalists at the 2018 Asian Games
Sport climbers at the 2020 Summer Olympics
Olympic sport climbers of South Korea
IFSC Climbing World Cup overall medalists
Boulder climbers